Wixom Performance Build Center (also called PBC) is a 100,000 square feet General Motors high performance engine factory in Wixom, Michigan.

History
The facility began production in 2005 with the 7.0L LS7 for the Corvette Z06 and the 4.4L Supercharged Northstar LC3 for the STS-V and XLR-V. Due to market conditions the LC3 was discontinued after the 2009 model year.

In 2013-01-30, General Motors announced the relocation of Performance Build Center to Bowling Green Assembly Plant, effective on the first quarter of 2014.

Investments
 2004 - $10 million to produce hand-built high-performance engines.

Products

 Current Products:
 6.2L V8 LS3
 7.0L V8 LS7
 Supercharged 6.2L V8 LS9
Past Products:
 4.4L Supercharged Northstar LC3

Product Applications
 6.2L V8 LS3 Engine 
 Chevrolet Corvette Grand Sport
 7.0L V8 LS7 Engine
 Chevrolet Corvette Z06
 Supercharged 6.2L V8 LS9 Engine
 Chevrolet Corvette ZR1

Employee Information
 Hourly: 18
 Salary: 11
 Union Local: UAW Local 2164

References

External links
Performance Build Center in Wixom

General Motors factories
2004 establishments in Michigan